The 1997 National Soccer League Grand Final was held on 25 May 1997 between Brisbane Strikers and Sydney United at Lang Park. Brisbane gained home advantage because despite finishing below United on the league standings, they defeated the Sydney side in the major semi-final two weeks prior. The teams were all locked up at half time, however two goals for the Strikers by Frank Farina and Rod Brown secured their first NSL championship.  Alan Hunter won the Joe Marston Medal.

Route to the final

League Standings

Finals Bracket

Match

Details

References 

1997 in Australian soccer
NSL Grand Finals
Soccer in Brisbane
Brisbane Strikers
Sydney United 58 FC matches